Tetragonoderus quadrum is a species of beetle in the family Carabidae. It was described by Fabricus in 1792.

References

quadrisignatus
Beetles described in 1792